María José Pérez Moreno (born 12 June 1992) is a Spanish runner competing primarily in the 3000 metres steeplechase. She represented her country at the 2017 World Championships without qualifying for the final.

International competitions

Personal bests

Outdoor
1500 metres – 4:29.79 (Valencia 2017)
3000 metres – 9:34.57 (San Sebastián 2017)
5000 metres – 16:09.83 (Ciudad Real 2017)
10,000 metres – 33:43.21 (Huelva 2017)
3000 metres steeplechase – 9:40.51 (Paris 2017)

Indoor
3000 metres – 9:53.76 (Antequera 2012)

References

1992 births
Living people
Spanish female middle-distance runners
Spanish female steeplechase runners
World Athletics Championships athletes for Spain
Sportspeople from the Province of Ciudad Real
21st-century Spanish women